Hildebrandtia is a genus of plants in the bindweed family Convolvulaceae.

Species
The following species are recognised in the genusHildebrandtia:

 Hildebrandtia africana
 Hildebrandtia aloysii
 Hildebrandtia austinii
 Hildebrandtia diredawaensis
 Hildebrandtia linearifolia
 Hildebrandtia obcordata
 Hildebrandtia promontorii
 Hildebrandtia sepalosa
 Hildebrandtia sericea
 Hildebrandtia somalensis
 Hildebrandtia valo

References

External links
  Taxonomic outline

Convolvulaceae
Convolvulaceae genera